The Canadian Library Association Young Adult Book Award was a literary award given annually from 1981 to 2016 to recognize a Canadian book of young adult fiction written in English and published in Canada, written by a citizen or permanent resident of Canada.

The award was administered and presented by the Canadian Library Association, which disbanded in 2016. The award was established by the Young Adult Caucus of the Saskatchewan Library Association in 1980 and inaugurated by an award to Kevin Major of Newfoundland and Labrador for Far from Shore, published by Clarke, Irwin & Company of Toronto.

The companion CLA Book of the Year for Children Award was inaugurated in 1947 and was presented annually without exception from 1963. Its criteria included "appeal to children up to and including age 12" and "creative (i.e., original) writing (i.e., fiction, poetry, narrative, non-fiction, retelling of traditional literature)". Corresponding criteria for the YA Book Award are "[appeal] to young adults between the ages of 13 and 18" and "fiction (novel, collection of short stories, or graphic novel)".

The Canadian Library Association also administered a book award for illustrators, the Amelia Frances Howard-Gibbon Illustrator's Award.

Winners 

 2016 Erin Bow, The Scorpion Rules (Simon & Schuster Canada)
 2015 Mariko Tamaki and Jillian Tamaki, This One Summer (Groundwood Books)
 2014 Karen Bass, Graffiti Knight (Pajama Press)
 2013 Martine Leavitt, My Book of Life by Angel (Groundwood Books, House of Anansi Press)
 2012 Catherine Austen, All Good Children (Orca Books)
 2011 Kenneth Oppel, Half Brother (HarperCollins)
 2010 Lesley Livingston, Wondrous Strange (HarperCollins)
 2009 Allan Stratton, Chanda's Wars (HarperCollins)
 2008 Martha Brooks, Mistik Lake (Groundwood Books)
 2007 William Bell, The Blue Helmet (Doubleday (publisher))
 2006 Shyam Selvadurai, Swimming in the Monsoon Sea (Tundra Books)
 2005 Miriam Toews, A Complicated Kindness (Alfred A. Knopf Canada)
 2004 Polly Horvath, The Canning Season (Groundwood Books/ Douglas & McIntyre) *
 2003 Martha Brooks, True Confessions of a Heartless Girl (Groundwood Books/ Douglas & McIntyre)
 2002 William Bell, Stones (Doubleday Canada)
 2001 Beth Goobie, Before Wings (Orca Books)
 2000 Katherine Holubitsky, Alone at Ninety Foot (Orca Books)
 1999 Gayle Friesen, Janey's Girl (Kids Can Press)
 1998 Martha Brooks, Bone Dance (Groundwood Books/ Douglas & McIntyre)
 1997 R. P. MacIntyre, Takes: Stories for Young Adults (Thistledown Press)
 1996 Tim Wynne-Jones, The Maestro (Groundwood Books/ Douglas & McIntyre)
 1995 Julie Johnston, Adam and Eve and Pinch-Me (Lester)
 1994 Sean Stewart, Nobody's Son (Maxwell Macmillan)
 1993 Karleen Bradford, There Will be Wolves (HarperCollins)
 1992 Susan Lynn Reynolds, Strandia (HarperCollins)
 1991 Budge Wilson, The Leaving (House of Anansi Press)
 1990 Diana Wieler, Bad Boy (Groundwood)
 1989 Helen Fogwill Porter, January, February, June or July (Breakwater Books)
 1988 Margaret Buffie, Who is Frances Rain? (Kids Can Press)
 1987 Janet Lunn, Shadow in Hawthorn Bay (Lester & Orpen Dennys)
 1986 Marianne Brandis, The Quarter-Pie Window (The Porcupine's Quill)
 1985 Mary-Ellen Lang Collura, Winners (Saskatoon, SK: Western Producer Prairie Books)
 1984 O. R. Melling, The Druid's Tune (Penguin Books)
 1983 Monica Hughes, Hunter in the Dark (Clarke, Irwin & Company)
 1982 Jamie Brown, Superbike (Clarke, Irwin & Company)
 1981 Kevin Major, Far from Shore (Clarke, Irwin & Company)

Repeat winners 

Martha Brooks is a three-time winner of the Young Adult Book Award for 1998, 2003, and 2008, William Bell (author) is a two-time winner, in 2002 and 2007.

Winners of multiple awards 

Two books won both the Young Adult Book Award and the CLA Book of the Year for Children Award: Shadow in Hawthorn Bay by Janet Lunn in 1987 and Half Brother by Kenneth Oppel in 2011.

Six books won both the Young Adult Book Award and the Governor General's Award for English-language children's literature, or Canada Council Children's Literature Prize before 1987. The writers and CLA award dates were Hughes 1983, Lunn 1987, (now under the present name) Wieler 1990, Johnston 1995, Wynne-Jones 1996, and Brooks 2003.

Thus Shadow in Hawthorn Bay (Lester & Orpen Dennys, 1986) by Janet Lunn won three major Canadian awards, the CLA awards for both children's and young-adult literature and the Governor General's Award in its last year as the Canada Council Children's Literature Prize.

Two winners of the CLA Young Adult Book Award were also recognized by major annual book awards in the United States. Polly Horvath won the 2003 National Book Award for Young People's Literature for The Canning Season. This One Summer, a graphic novel by Mariko and Jillian Tamaki, was one of the 2015 Honour Books, or finalists, for both the American Library Association (ALA) Michael L. Printz Award as the year's best new work for young adults judged "by literary merit alone" (recognizing Mariko Tamaki) and the ALA Caldecott Medal, or children's picture book illustration award (recognizing Jillian Tamaki).

See also 

 CLA Book of the Year for Children Award
 ALA Michael L. Printz Award
 British Carnegie Medal
 Amelia Frances Howard-Gibbon Illustrator's Award

References

External links 
 Book Awards at the Canadian Library Association (cla.org)

Young adult literature awards
1981 establishments in Canada
Awards established in 1981